Daniel Bishop may refer to:

 Dan Bishop (born 1964), American attorney and politician; U.S. Representative from North Carolina
 Daniel Bishop, American drummer for Christian rock band Slingshot 57
 Daniel Bishop Meigs (1835–1916), Canadian politician